Let It Bee is the debut album by alternative rock band Voice of the Beehive. Released in 1988 on London Records, the album earned positive reviews from music critics and was a success on U.S. college radio stations. In the UK, the album reached #13 on the albums chart in its debut week ending 2 July 1988. The album peaked at #53 in Australia on the ARIA albums chart, and #40 in New Zealand.

The group had their first top 40 hit single in the UK with "Don't Call Me Baby" from the album, which reached #15.  Let It Bee contained two bonus tracks on the U.S. edition (they were not listed on the CD cover, but were listed within the text on the disc).

Track listing
"The Beat of Love" (Tracey Bryn, Brad Nack, temptation rap by Melissa Brooke) – 4:08
"Sorrow Floats" (Bryn) – 4:23
"Don't Call Me Baby" (Bryn, Mike Jones) – 3:11
"Man in the Moon" (Bryn, Brooke) – 3:16
"What You Have Is Enough" (Bryn) – 2:38
"Oh Love" (Brooke, Jones) – 2:59
"I Walk the Earth" (Nack) – 3:42
"Trust Me" (Bryn) – 3:22
"I Say Nothing" (Bryn, Jones) – 3:32
"There's a Barbarian in the Back of My Car" (Bryn, Zodiac Mindwarp) – 2:38
"Just a City" (Bryn, Jones) – 4:27
"This Weak" (Bryn, Jones) (bonus track, U.S. only) – 3:14
"Jesus" (Lou Reed) (bonus track, U.S. only) – 3:24

Charts

2022 deluxe edition

Singles
 1987 "Just a City"
 1987 "I Say Nothing" #45 UK, #73 AUS
 1988 "I Walk the Earth" #42 UK
 1988 "Don't Call Me Baby" #15 UK, #48 AUS, #25 NZ
 1988 "I Say Nothing" (re-issue) #22 UK, #11 U.S. Modern Rock Tracks
 1988 "I Walk the Earth" (re-issue) #46 UK
 1988 "Man in the Moon" #93 UK

Personnel

The band 
 Tracey Bryn – vocals and guitar
 Melissa Brooke Belland – vocals
 Mike Jones – guitars, vocals, keyboards, and keyboard programming
 Martin Brett – bass guitar and piano
 D. M. Woodgate – drums, percussion, triggers, and keyboard programming

Additional musicians 
 Henrick – keyboards
 Dave Swarbrick – fiddle
 The Kick – horns, Ladbroke Grove Man on "The Beat of Love" intro
 Marvin Etzioni – mandolin, piano

Production 
 Pete Collins – "The Beat of Love", "Sorrow Floats", "Don't Call Me Baby", "Man in the Moon", "I Walk the Earth", "Trust Me" and "I Say Nothing"
 Hugh Jones – "Just a City", "There's a Barbarian in the Back of My Car" and "What You Have Is Enough"
 Marvin Etzioni – "Oh Love"
 Mike Jones – "This Weak" and "Jesus"

References 

1988 debut albums
Voice of the Beehive albums
Albums produced by Hugh Jones (producer)
London Records albums